Papilionanthe biswasiana is a species of epiphytic orchid native to Laos, China, Myanmar, and Thailand. Is is closely related to Papilionanthe vandarum.

Description
It bears distichously arranged, terete leaves. Stomata are presented on the entire leaf surface. Most stoma were brachyparacytic and laterocytic, but some were stephanocytic. The inflorescences, which usually do not exceed the length of the leaves, produce 1 to 3 widely opening, creamy white or slightly pink, large and thinly textured flowers in spring.

Conservation
This species is included in the CITES appendix II.

References

biswasiana
Orchids of Myanmar
Orchids of China
Orchids of Laos
Orchids of Thailand